Percy Jackson & the Olympians: The Lightning Thief (also known as Percy Jackson and the Lightning Thief) is a 2010 action fantasy film directed by Chris Columbus from a screenplay by Craig Titley, based on the 2005 novel The Lightning Thief by Rick Riordan. The film is the first installment in the Percy Jackson film series. It stars Logan Lerman as Percy Jackson alongside an ensemble cast that includes Brandon T. Jackson, Alexandra Daddario, Sean Bean, Pierce Brosnan, Steve Coogan, Rosario Dawson, Catherine Keener, Kevin McKidd, Joe Pantoliano, and Uma Thurman.

Percy Jackson & the Olympians: The Lightning Thief was released theatrically in the United States on February 12, 2010, by 20th Century Fox. The film received mixed reviews from critics, with criticism for the poor grasp of its source material and its script, but praise for Lerman and Jackson's performances, visual effects, and the action sequences. The film grossed $226.4 million worldwide against a production budget of $95 million. It was released on June 29, 2010 on DVD and Blu-ray Disc. A video game based on the film was released for Nintendo DS on February 11, 2010. A sequel, Percy Jackson: Sea of Monsters, was released on August 7, 2013.

Plot
At the top of the Empire State Building, Zeus meets Poseidon, who accuses Poseidon's demigod son, Percy Jackson, of stealing his master lightning bolt. Poseidon reminds Zeus that Percy is unaware of his true identity, but Zeus declares that unless the bolt is returned to Mount Olympus before midnight of the Summer Solstice in two weeks, war will be waged between all the gods.

A 16-year-old Percy struggles with dyslexia and ADHD, but has a unique ability to stay underwater for long periods of time. On a school trip to the Metropolitan Museum of Art, Percy is attacked by Alecto, a Fury masquerading as his substitute English teacher, who demands the lightning bolt. Percy's best friend Grover Underwood and his Latin teacher Mr. Brunner help scare off Alecto. Mr. Brunner gives Percy a pen which he claims is a very powerful cosmic weapon, and instructs Grover to take Percy and his mother Sally to Camp Half-Blood — a hidden summer camp for demigod children on Long Island, leaving behind Sally's abusive husband and Percy's stepfather, Gabe Ugliano. There, they are attacked by the Minotaur, who seemingly kills Percy's mother. Percy discovers that Mr. Brunner's pen is a magical sword, and uses it to fight off the Minotaur, killing it with its own horn.

Waking up three days later, Percy learns he is the son of Poseidon, Grover is a satyr and Percy’s protector, and Mr. Brunner is Chiron, a centaur. Percy starts coming into his latent demigod powers, which include hydrokinesis and healing, and meets other demigods, including Annabeth Chase, daughter of Athena; and the camp's leader Luke Castellan, son of Hermes. Percy is visited by an apparition of Hades, who reveals that the Minotaur abducted Sally to the Underworld to trade for the lightning bolt. Defying Chiron's orders, Percy sets out for the Underworld with Grover and Annabeth. Luke gives Percy a map with the location of three green pearls belonging to Hades' wife, Persephone, which will allow them to escape the Underworld. Percy is also given a pair of flying winged Converse All-Stars stolen from Hermes, and Luke's favorite shield. Meanwhile, Percy is declared a missing person.

At a garden centre in New Jersey, with help from Grover and Annabeth, Percy manages to decapitate Medusa and takes the first pearl from her corpse. At the Parthenon in Nashville, Percy uses the shoes to retrieve the second pearl from the crown of the statue of Athena there, and Grover kills a Hydra with Medusa's head. The trio arrive at the Lotus Hotel and Casino in Las Vegas to obtain the third pearl; however, they forget their mission after eating lotus flowers, the effects from which causes them to lose sense of time. Percy snaps out from the spell after hearing the voice of Poseidon through telepathy telling him not to eat any more flowers. Percy frees Grover and Annabeth from the flowers' effects; they locate the final pearl in the casino and escape the hotel. Annabeth realizes that they only have one day left to prevent the gods' war, as they were in the casino for almost a week. They discover that the Underworld is in Hollywood and race there. With all three pearls, Percy, Grover, and Annabeth enter the portal to the Underworld upon arriving in Hollywood.

In the Underworld, Hades finds the lightning bolt hidden inside Luke's shield, revealing that Luke was the thief all along. Hades tries to kill the trio, but Persephone turns on him in retaliation for imprisoning her, and gives the bolt to Percy. As they only have three pearls, Grover remains behind, while Percy, Annabeth, and Sally teleport to the Empire State Building, the entrance to Mount Olympus. However, before they can enter, they are ambushed by Luke, who reveals that he stole the bolt to demolish Mount Olympus and establish the demigods as new rulers of Western civilization. After a battle across Manhattan, Percy defeats Luke, returns the lightning bolt to Zeus, and reconciles with his father. Having been reunited with Grover, Percy and Annabeth continue to train back at Camp Half-Blood.

In a mid-credits scene, Sally has kicked Gabe out of her apartment. He breaks open the locked refrigerator to get a beer and is turned to stone by Medusa's head.

Cast

 Logan Lerman as Percy Jackson, the demigod son of Poseidon
 Brandon T. Jackson as Grover Underwood, Percy's best friend and protector, a satyr and Persephone's love interest
 Alexandra Daddario as Annabeth Chase, the demigod daughter of Athena, and Percy's romantic foil
 Jake Abel as Luke Castellan, the demigod son of Hermes
 Sean Bean as Zeus, god of the sky, thunder, lightning, king of the twelve gods of Mount Olympus and brother of Poseidon and Hades
 Kevin McKidd as Poseidon, Percy's father, god of the seas, earthquakes, and horses
 Steve Coogan as Hades, Percy's Uncle, god of the Underworld, the dead, and riches
 Melina Kanakaredes as Athena, Annabeth's mother, goddess of crafts, domestic arts, strategic warfare, peace and wisdom
 Rosario Dawson as Persephone, goddess of springtime, wife of Hades and admirer of Grover
 Dylan Neal as Hermes, Luke's father, god of trade, thieves, travelers, sports, athletes, and messenger of the gods of Mount Olympus
 Erica Cerra as Hera, goddess of birth, family, marriage, women and queen of the twelve gods of Mount Olympus, sister and wife of Zeus
 Stefanie von Pfetten as Demeter, goddess of agriculture, fertility, and the harvest, sister of Zeus and mother of Persephone
 Dimitri Lekkos as Apollo, god of the sun, light, knowledge, healing, plague and darkness, the arts, music, poetry, prophecy, archery, and twin brother of Artemis
 Ona Grauer as Artemis, goddess of the hunt, virginity, the moon, and all animals, and twin sister of Apollo
 Serinda Swan as Aphrodite, goddess of love, beauty, wife of Hephaestus and lover of Ares
 Conrad Coates as Hephaestus, god of fire, forge, blacksmiths, craftsmen and husband of Aphrodite
 Ray Winstone as Ares, god of war, lover of Aphrodite (uncredited)
 Luke Camilleri as Dionysus, god of wine, celebrations, ecstasy, and theatre 
 Uma Thurman as Medusa, a gorgon cursed by Athena
 Pierce Brosnan as Mr. Brunner/Chiron, a centaur who is a high school teacher and also trains heroes at Camp Half-Blood, the immortal son of Kronos and brother of Zeus, Poseidon, Hades, Demeter, and Hera
 Maria Olsen as Mrs. Dodds / Alecto, a Fury, servant to Hades
 Julian Richings as Charon, ferryman of the River Styx, servant to Hades
 Catherine Keener as Sally Jackson, Percy's mother
 Joe Pantoliano as Gabe Ugliano, Percy's abusive stepfather

Production

In June 2004, 20th Century Fox acquired feature film rights to the book. In April 2007, director Chris Columbus was hired to helm the project. Filming began in April 2009 in Vancouver, and Mammoth Studios in Burnaby was selected to be the studio. Portions of the film were shot at the Parthenon in Nashville, Tennessee, that has a full-scale replica of the original Parthenon in Athens. The Lotus Casino sequence was filmed at The Westin Bayshore in Vancouver in June 2009, and additional scenes of Percy, Grover and Annabeth driving to and from the casino were shot on the Las Vegas Strip and in front of the Fremont Street Experience. Filming wrapped up on the morning of July 25, 2009, in Mission, British Columbia. Additional exterior scenes were filmed on location in Brooklyn, New York during the first week of August 2009. Digital intermediate work began in San Francisco in November 2009. Christophe Beck composed the score. Columbus has stated that the cast was chosen specifically with sequels in mind. "I think with Percy Jackson it was a matter of finding the right cast to fit into these roles, sort of the perfect cast for these roles, because hopefully, God willing, we will go on to do other Percy Jackson films and you want the cast to grow with their characters".

During production, Riordan was disappointed with the changes made to the story and warned the studio that it would likely alienate the readers of the book series that it was depending on to buy tickets. In two emails commenting at length on a draft of the script that he posted to his blog in 2018, he specifically warned the studio that trying to make the story more attractive to a teenage audience by aging the characters and including some profanity in the script might move a significant portion of the books' readers to leave the theater in disgust long before the movie ended. He also felt the introduction of Persephone's pearls as a plot device made no sense, having no basis in mythology and distracting Percy from his goal of recovering the stolen lightning.

Reception

Box office
The film opened on February 12, 2010, in 3,356 theaters; its opening weekend box-office results totaled $31.2 million in the U.S., finishing at #3 below The Wolfman, which opened at #2 with $31.5 million and below Valentine's Day, which opened at #1 with $56.3 million. The film had a strong opening weekend for its genre, posting the highest opening weekend for a fantasy film not from the Harry Potter, Chronicles of Narnia, or Lord of the Rings series. As of September 14, 2010, it grossed a total of $88.8 million in the U.S. and Canada with $137.7 million elsewhere in the world, bringing it to $226.5 million.

Critical response
On Rotten Tomatoes the film has an approval rating of 49% based on reviews from 150 critics, with an average score of 5.30/10. The site's consensus reads: "Though it may seem like just another Harry Potter knockoff, Percy Jackson benefits from a strong supporting cast, a speedy plot, and plenty of fun with Greek mythology." On Metacritic it has a score of 47 out of 100, based on 31 reviews, indicating "mixed or average reviews". Audiences polled by CinemaScore gave the film a grade B+ on a scale from A+ to F.

Kenneth Turan of the Los Angeles Times described the film as "standard Hollywood product... unadventurous and uninteresting". The reviewer for The Washington Post thought "the movie suffers by taking itself a little too seriously. It's not just that it's a lot less funny than the book. It's also a lot less fun". On BBC Radio 5, Mark Kermode criticized the similarity of the film to director Chris Columbus's Harry Potter films, likening it to a Harry Potter parody book and dubbing it Benjamin Sniddlegrass and the Cauldron of Penguins. This comment later sparked a satirical fan creation with precisely that title, narrated by Stephen Fry.

The author, Rick Riordan, publicly criticized the final script. He revealed email recommendations for script changes with names redacted. Regarding future support for a reboot Riordan said, "In the future, if some project actually does get underway, I may not be able to comment on it for contractual reasons, but you can tell how I'm feeling about it by what I do or don’t say. Am I talking about it? Promoting it? Sharing cool things? I am probably happy. Am I completely ignoring it and never mentioning it on social media? Yeah . . . that’s probably not a good sign. For instance, check out my website, rickriordan.com. Do you see any indication there that the Percy Jackson movies ever existed? No. No, you do not." He also shared in the same email “The script as a whole is terrible. I don't simply mean that it deviates from the book, though certainly it does that to point of being almost unrecognizable as the same story. Fans of the books will be angry and disappointed.”

Accolades

Soundtrack

Video game
A video game based on the film developed by Griptonite Games and published by Activision was released exclusively for Nintendo DS on February 11, 2010. GameZone's Michael Splechta gave it a 6/10, saying "Percy Jackson might not make a splash when it comes to movie tie-in games, but fans of turn-based combat might find some redeeming qualities in this otherwise bare-bones game." On Metacritic, the game has a score of 56 out of 100 based on 6 reviews, indicating "mixed or average reviews".

Home media
The film was released on June 29, 2010 on DVD and Blu-ray. The movie itself charted at the top of the charts (DVD sales) with $13,985,047 in revenue in its first week. As of October 2011, the movie had sold 2,087,368 DVDs with over $37 million in sales.

Sequel

In October 2011, 20th Century Fox announced a stand-alone sequel based on the second book, The Sea of Monsters. The film was released on August 7, 2013.

References

External links

 
 
 

1492 Pictures films
2010 fantasy films
2010s English-language films
2010s fantasy adventure films
2010s teen fantasy films
20th Century Fox films
American fantasy adventure films
British fantasy adventure films
Cultural depictions of Medusa
Dune Entertainment films
Empire State Building in fiction
Films about size change
Films about summer camps
Films based on American novels
Films based on classical mythology
Films based on fantasy novels
Films based on young adult literature
Films directed by Chris Columbus
Films produced by Michael Barnathan
Films produced by Chris Columbus
Films produced by Karen Rosenfelt
Films scored by Christophe Beck
Films set in the Las Vegas Valley
Films set in Los Angeles
Films set in Manhattan
Films set in Nashville, Tennessee
Films set in New Jersey
Films set in New York City
Films shot in Tennessee
Films shot in New York City
Films shot in Vancouver
Films with screenplays by Craig Titley
Percy Jackson & the Olympians
Teen adventure films
2010s American films
2010s British films